PNS Tughril is the first of four Chinese built Type 054A/P (Tughril-class) frigates named after Turkish emperor ordered by the Pakistan Navy. It was commissioned on 8 November 2021. The Type 054A/P carries HQ-16 medium-range air defense missiles which is an upgrade from the HQ-7 and anti-submarine missiles in a vertical launching system (VLS) system.

The ship is named after Emperor Tughril, who was among the founders of the Seljuk Empire.

The ship was commissioned on 8 November 2021.

Commissioning 
Tughril was formally commissioned into the Pakistan Navy on 24 January 2022, at the Karachi Naval Dockyard, with Pakistan's president - Arif Alvi and the chief of the Pakistan Navy - Amjad Khan Niazi, in attendance. The formal commissioning of Tughril coincided with the induction of ten second-hand WS-61 Sea King naval helicopters into the Pakistan Naval Air Arm.

References

2020 ships
Frigates of the Pakistan Navy
China–Pakistan military relations